The 2018 Southwestern Athletic Conference baseball tournament was  at Wesley Barrow Stadium in New Orleans, Louisiana, from May 16 through 20.  As winner of the tournament, Texas Southern earned the conference's automatic bid to the 2018 NCAA Division I baseball tournament.

The double elimination tournament features four teams from each division.

Seeding and format
The four eligible teams in each division were seeded one through four, with the top seed from each division facing the fourth seed from the opposite division in the first round, and so on.  The teams then played a two bracket, double-elimination tournament with a one-game final between the winners of each bracket.

Bracket

References

Tournament
Southwestern Athletic Conference Baseball Tournament
Southwestern Athletic Conference baseball tournament
Southwestern Athletic Conference baseball tournament